Keagan Young (born July 30, 2001) is a Canadian judoka who competes in the men's 90 kg category and formerly in the 81 kg category. Young was raised and lives in Markham, Ontario, Canada.

Career

Junior
At the 2017 World Judo Cadets Championships in Santiago, Chile, Young won the bronze medal in the 66 kg category.

In July 2018, Young won gold at the Pan American Cadet Judo Championships in Cordoba, Argentina and became the world's number one ranked cadet judoka in the 81 kg category. Young won Canada's first medal at the 2018 Summer Youth Olympics in Buenos Aires, Argentina, a bronze medal in the –81 kg event.

Senior
In the senior category, Young moved up a weight category to compete in the 90 kg event. At the 2022 Pan American-Oceania Judo Championships in Lima, Peru, Young finished in fifth in the 90 kg category. Young was named to his first national senior multi-sport event team for the 2022 Commonwealth Games in June 2022.

References

External links
 

Canadian male judoka
2001 births
Living people
Sportspeople from Markham, Ontario
Judoka at the 2018 Summer Youth Olympics
Medalists at the 2018 Summer Youth Olympics
Youth Olympic bronze medalists for Canada
21st-century Canadian people